Skenes Creek North is a rural locality in Victoria, Australia, situated in the Shire of Colac Otway.

A telegraph/post office named "Biddles" opened around June 1920. It was renamed Skene's Creek North on 1 January 1938 and closed on 15 January 1960.

References

Towns in Victoria (Australia)